Ethel Muckelt (30 May 1885 – 13 December 1953) was a British figure skater who competed in singles and pairs. As a single skater, she won the bronze medal at the 1924 Winter Olympics. As a pair skater, she placed fifth at the 1920 Summer Olympics with Sydney Wallwork. With John Page, she won the silver medal at the 1924 World Figure Skating Championships and placed fourth at that year's Olympics.

Muckelt came from a family of prosperous dye manufacturers. She was one of the oldest Winter Olympics medallists, as she was 38 in 1924, and she continued competing into her fifties.

Competitive highlights

Ladies' singles

Pairs with Wallwork

Pairs with Page

References

External links
 Skatabase: 1920s Worlds – pairs
 Skatabase: 1920s Olympics – pairs
 Database Olympics

1885 births
1953 deaths
British female pair skaters
British female single skaters
Figure skaters at the 1920 Summer Olympics
Figure skaters at the 1924 Winter Olympics
Figure skaters at the 1928 Winter Olympics
Medalists at the 1924 Winter Olympics
Olympic bronze medallists for Great Britain
Olympic figure skaters of Great Britain
Olympic medalists in figure skating
World Figure Skating Championships medalists